Mad River Township may refer to:

 Mad River Township, Champaign County, Ohio 
 Mad River Township, Clark County, Ohio 
 Mad River Township, Montgomery County, Ohio (defunct)

See also
 Mad River (disambiguation)

Ohio township disambiguation pages